Samuil's Inscription represents the content found on the tombstone of Samuel of Bulgaria's parents, erected in 992/3. This inscription, which was made by the order of Tsar Samuel, mentions the names of his parents and of his brother David.

Currently, the tombstone is stored at the National Archaeological Museum in Sofia, Bulgaria. In 1916, it was transported there from the village of Agios Germanos, near Lake Prespa in Greece. The dimensions of the tombstone are 125–130 cm high, 52–67 cm wide, and 7–10 cm thick. The inscription has been cited by historians such as Fyodor Uspensky, Iordan Ivanov, and Nicholas Adontz.

Inscription 
Original text with reconstructed parts in square brackets and modern-style spaces, capital letters and punctuation (hyphens, commas, two dots and a colon) added:
 
 
 
 
 
 
 
 
 
 
 

The following is the French translation of the inscription by Adontz:

"Au nom du Père et du Fils et du Saint-Esprit, moi, Samuel, serviteur de Dieu, je fais mémoire de mon père, de ma mère et de mon frère sur ces croix. Voici les noms des défunts: Nicolas, serviteur de Dieu; Ripsimé et David. Écrit en l'an de la création 6501, indiction VI."

In English, translated from the French: "In the name of the Father and the Son and the Holy Spirit, I, Samuel, servant of God, made a memory of my father, of my mother and of my brother on these crosses. Here are the names of the deceased: Nikolas, servant of God, Ripsimia and David. Written in the year 6501 since Creation, VI indiction."

The year 6501 since the creation of the world corresponds to 992-993 CE.

Notes

See also
 Comitopuli dynasty
 Bitola Inscription
 History of Bulgaria
 History of the Republic of Macedonia

Literature
 Успенскiй, Ф. И. ( Uspenskiĭ, Fedor I., 1845-1928) Надпис царя Самуила,  Известия Русского Археологического Института в Константинополе,1898, III, с. 184 - 194.
 Иванов, Йор. (Ivanov, Ĭor.) Български старини из Македония. София, 1931, с. 25.
 Ivanov, Ĭordan (1872-1947). Bŭlgarski starini na Makedoniia, 1970.
 Кос, М. (Kos, Milko) О натпису цара Самуила, Гласник српског научног друштва 5, 1929, с. 203 - 209.
 Степанос Таронеци-Асохик (Asoghik, Stepanos T., 10th - 11th c.). Всеобщая история Степаноса Таронского - Асохика по прoзванию, писателя ХІ столетия. Перевод с армянскoго и объяснения Н.Эминым. Москва, Типография Лазаревского института восточных языков. 1864. XVIII, 335 стр.
 Asoghik (Stepanos de Taron). L'histoire universelle, Paris, 1859. Translation in German, Leipzig, 1907.
 Stepanos, Tarōnetsi (Stepanos Asoghik Taronetsi, 10th-11th c.) Tiezerakan patmutyun, Erevan, 2000, Pp. 455 (303 - 304).
 Adontz, Nikoghayos. Samuel l'Armenien, Roi des Bulgares. Bruxelles, Palais des academies, 1938, Pp. 63.
 Adontz, Nicolas. Etudes Armeno-Byzantines. Livraria Bertrand. Lisbonne, 1965, pp. 347–407 (384).
 Lang, David M. The Bulgarians, London, 1976.
 Lang, David M. The Armenians. A People in Exile. London, 1981, Pp. 203 (55, 105).

External links
 Picture of the actual tombstone

10th century in Bulgaria
Medieval Macedonia
Old Bulgarian inscriptions
Inscriptions in medieval Macedonia